Bajram Jashanica (born 25 September 1990) is a Kosovan professional footballer who plays as a centre-back for Kosovan club Ballkani.

Club career

Hysi and unsuccessful test with FSV Frankfurt
Jashanica was one of Hysi's main players and 2010–11 season proved successful after he and even his team is announced campion of 2010–11 Football Superleague of Kosovo and winner of 2011 Kosovo Supercup. On 19 March 2013, Liga-Zwei.de announced that Jashanica is in the test to 2. Bundesliga side FSV Frankfurt, but unfortunately this test turned out to fail.

Skënderbeu Korçë
In mid-August 2013, Jashanica joined Albanian Superliga side Skënderbeu Korçë.

Loan at Besa Kavajë
On 2 September 2013, Jashanica joined to another Albanian Superliga club Besa Kavajë, on a season-long loan. On 20 October 2013, he made his debut in a 1–1 away draw against Kukësi after coming on as a substitute at 74th minute in place of Fisnik Ramadanaj.

Return from loan

2014–15 season
On 30 June 2014, Jashanica is returned to Skënderbeu Korçë after the loan. His debut with Skënderbeu Korçë came on 17 August in the 2014 Albanian Supercup against Flamurtari Vlorë after coming on as a substitute at 65th minute in place of Tefik Osmani.

At the end of the 2014–15 season, Jashanica renewed his contract with Skënderbeu Korçë for another two years alongside fellow Kosovo Albanian player Leonit Abazi. On 5 June 2015, the contract officially was signed and it the two-year contract would keep he at the club until at least of 2017, but with the option of another year as well.

2015–16 season
Jashanica started the 2015–16 season as the best, he netted in a header from a corner assisted by teammate Bernard Berisha in a 5–1 away defeat in the group stage of 2015–16 UEFA Europa League against Sporting CP, that was the first ever goal that Skënderbeu Korçë have scored in a major tournament. He, became one of Skënderbeu Korçë's main players and played 22 matches in the league as Skënderbeu Korçë finished as champion.

Ban from football by UEFA
In April 2018, Panorama Sport announced that Jashanica it is at risk to be punished with a two-year ban from football by UEFA. On 12 June 2018, Skënderbeu Korçë announced that Jashanica had been handed a two-year ban from UEFA competitions due to testing positive in anti-doping testing.

Return from ban
Jashanica's disqualification expired on 23 February 2020 and eight days later, he played his first match after returned from ban in the 2019–20 Albanian Superliga match against Vllaznia Shkodër after being named in the starting line-up.

International career
On 19 May 2014, Jashanica received a call-up from Kosovo for the friendly matches against Turkey and Senegal. On 21 May 2014, he made his debut with Kosovo in friendly match against Turkey after coming on as a substitute at 80th minute in place of Mehmet Hetemaj.

Career statistics

Club

International

Honours
Hysi
Football Superleague of Kosovo (1): 2010–11

Skënderbeu Korçë
Albanian Superliga (2): 2014–15, 2015–16
Albanian Supercup (1): 2014

References

External links

1990 births
Living people
Sportspeople from Pristina
Kosovo Albanians
Kosovan footballers
Kosovo international footballers
Kosovan expatriate footballers
Expatriate footballers in Albania
Kosovan expatriate sportspeople in Albania
Association football central defenders
Football Superleague of Kosovo players
KF Hysi players
KF Ballkani players
Kategoria Superiore players
KF Skënderbeu Korçë players
Besa Kavajë players